is a former Japanese football player and manager. His elder brother Shinkichi Kikuchi is also a former footballer.

Playing career
Kikuchi was born in Tono on July 17, 1973. After graduating from high school, he joined Verdy Kawasaki (later Tokyo Verdy) in 1992. His elder brother Shinkichi Kikuchi plays also in this club for a long time. In 1995, he debuted and played many matches as mainly right and left side back. The club won the 2nd place 1995 J1 League and the champions 1996 Emperor's Cup. However his opportunity to play decreased from 1996. He also played for several clubs, Gamba Osaka (1997, 1999), Sanfrecce Hiroshima (1999), Omiya Ardija (2000). He retired end of 2002 season.

Coaching career
After retirement, Kikuchi started coaching career at Tokyo Verdy in 2003. He mainly served coach for youth team in his local Iwate Prefecture until 2012. In 2017, he signed with his local club Grulla Morioka (later Iwate Grulla Morioka) in J3 League and became a manager.

Club statistics

Managerial statistics
Update; December 31, 2018

References

External links
 
 
 biglobe.ne.jp

1973 births
Living people
Association football people from Iwate Prefecture
Japanese footballers
J1 League players
J2 League players
Tokyo Verdy players
Gamba Osaka players
Sanfrecce Hiroshima players
Omiya Ardija players
Japanese football managers
J3 League managers
Iwate Grulla Morioka managers
Association football defenders